Publius Quinctilius Varus (Cremona, 46 BC – Teutoburg Forest, AD 9) was a Roman general and politician under the first Roman emperor Augustus. Varus is generally remembered for having lost three Roman legions when ambushed by Germanic tribes led by Arminius in the Battle of the Teutoburg Forest, whereupon he killed himself.

Background and early career
Although he was a patrician by birth, his family, the Quinctilii Vari, had long been impoverished and was unimportant; Ronald Syme notes, "The sole and last consul of that family", Sextus Quinctilius, "had been two years antecedent to the Decemvirs" (i.e. 453 BC). His father, Sextus Quinctilius Varus, was a senator who had served as a quaestor in 49 BC. This Sextus aligned with the Senatorial Party in the civil war against Julius Caesar. Although Sextus survived the defeat, it is unknown whether he was involved in the assassination of Julius Caesar. Sextus committed suicide after the Battle of Philippi in 42 BC. The mother of Varus is unknown; Syme notes that "no relatives on either side of the family can be discovered or surmised."

Varus had three sisters, all named Quinctilia. They were probably all younger based on when they started having children, so it seems likely he was born at least four years before his father's suicide. The fact that they had advantageous marriages indicates someone was involved in their upbringing. One sister married Publius Cornelius Dolabella, consul of 35 BC; another married Sextus Appuleius, consul of 29 BC; and the third married Lucius Nonius Asprenas, son of the consul of 36 BC.

Despite Varus’ father's political allegiances, he became a supporter of Julius Caesar's heir, Octavian. When Marcus Vipsanius Agrippa died in early 12 BC, Varus delivered the funeral eulogy alongside the future emperor Tiberius. With his political career thus boosted, he was elected consul in 13 BC as the colleague of Tiberius.

Marriages and children
Varus married Vipsania, daughter of Agrippa, at an unknown date before 13 BC. Varus became a personal friend to Marcus Agrippa and Tiberius. The historian Josephus says (in a section of his Antiquities whose manuscript tradition Walther John believed to be corrupt) that the son of Varus, also named "Publius Quinctilius Varus", served under him during his command in Syria.  If true, that son would have to be a son by a prior marriage and not the son by his last wife, Claudia Pulchra. It is possible that this son might have instead been an older son, Sextus Nonius Quinctilianus, who might have ended up adopted by his sister's husband after Varus and Vipsania died. That would explain why a son of Lucius Nonius Asprenas was named Quinctilianus, which implied adoption.

Vipsania disappears from history. It is unknown whether she died or was divorced. Varus then married Claudia Pulchra. She was a daughter of Claudia Marcella Minor and the Roman consul of 12 BC, Marcus Valerius Messalla Appianus. Her maternal grandmother was Octavia the Younger, sister of Augustus. Hence she was a grand-niece of Augustus. His marriage to Pulchra shows that Varus still enjoyed political favor. Pulchra bore Varus a son, also called Publius Quinctilius Varus. Through their son, they may have had further descendants.

Political career

In 8–7 BC, Varus governed the province of Africa. Later he went to govern Syria from 7–6 BC until 4 BC with four legions under his command, where he was known for his harsh rule and high taxes. The Jewish historian Josephus mentions the swift action of Varus against a messianic revolt in Judaea after the death of the Roman client king, Herod the Great, in 4 BC. After occupying Jerusalem, he crucified 2000 Jewish rebels and may have thus been one of the prime objects of popular anti-Roman sentiment in Judaea (Josephus, who made every effort to reconcile the Jewish people to Roman rule, felt it necessary to point out how lenient this judicial massacre had been). Indeed, at precisely this moment the Jews, nearly en masse, began a full-scale boycott of Roman pottery (red slip ware). Thus, the archaeological record seems to verify mass popular protest against Rome because of Varus' cruelty.

Following the massacre in Judaea, Varus returned to Antioch. Between 10 BC and 6 AD Tiberius, his brother Drusus, Lucius Domitius Ahenobarbus, and Germanicus conducted long campaigns in Germania, the area north of the Upper Danube and east of the Rhine, in an attempt at achieving a further major expansion of the Roman Empire together with a shortening of its frontier line. They subdued several Germanic tribes, such as the Cherusci. In 6 AD, Tiberius declared Germania pacified, and Varus was appointed to govern it. Tiberius, who would later rule as emperor, left the region to suppress the Great Illyrian Revolt. Augustus made Publius Quinctilius Varus the first "officially appointed" governor of the newly created Roman province of Germania in 7 AD.

Battle of the Teutoburg Forest and death

In September 9 AD Varus was preparing to leave his summer headquarters in Vetera (today Xanten) and march three legions – the Seventeenth, Eighteenth, and Nineteenth – with him to Moguntiacum (modern-day Mainz), when news arrived from the Germanic prince Arminius (a Roman citizen and leader of an auxiliary cavalry unit) of a growing revolt in the Rhine area to the West. Ignoring a warning from Segestes not to trust Arminius, Varus marched his forces behind the latter's lead.

Not only was Varus' trust in Arminius a terrible misjudgement, but Varus compounded it by placing his legions in a position where their fighting strengths would be minimized and those of the Germanic tribesmen maximized – because he expected no ambush and very little trouble in intimidating the rebels. Arminius and the Cherusci tribe along with other allies, had skillfully laid an ambush, and in the Battle of the Teutoburg Forest in September at Kalkriese (East of modern Osnabrück), the Romans marched right into it.

The heavily forested, swampy terrain made the infantry manoeuvres of the legions impossible to execute and allowed the Germans to defeat the legions in detail. On the third day of fighting, the Germans overwhelmed the Romans at Kalkriese Hill, north of Osnabrück. Accounts of the defeat are scarce, due to the totality of the defeat, but Velleius Paterculus testifies that some Roman cavalrymen abandoned the infantry and fled towards the Rhine, but they were intercepted by the German tribesmen and killed. Varus himself, upon seeing all hope was lost, committed suicide by falling on his sword. Arminius cut off his head and sent it to Bohemia as a present to King Marbod of the Marcomanni, the other most important Germanic leader, whom Arminius wanted to coax into an alliance, but Marbod declined the offer and sent the head on to Rome for burial.

Some captured Romans were caged and burned alive; others were enslaved or ransomed. Tacitus and Florus report that the victorious Germanic tribes tortured and sacrificed captive officers to their gods on altars that could still be seen years later. The Romans did later recover the lost legions' eagles, one each in 15 AD, 16 AD and 42 AD.

Aftermath
Due to the shame and the ill luck thought to be created by the Roman defeat, the XVII, XVIII and XIX legions never again appeared in the Roman Army's order of battle. The loss at the Teutoburg Forest was keenly felt by Augustus in his remaining years. According to the biographer Suetonius, upon hearing the news, Augustus tore his clothes, refused to cut his hair for months and, for years afterwards, was heard, upon occasion, to moan, "Quinctilius Varus, give me back my legions!". Roman historians referred to the battle as the clades Variana ("Varian disaster").

Gibbon describes Augustus' reaction to the defeat as one of the few times the normally stoic ruler lost his composure. Varus' political legacy in Rome was destroyed and the government blamed him for the defeat. His son's (the younger Varus) chances for a political career were ruined. Tiberius himself fell under severe criticism for recommending Varus as the governor of Germania. Tiberius, according to Gaius Stern, was forced to sacrifice his friend and former brother-in-law to save his career. Furthermore, Varus himself had been one of the figures on the Ara Pacis, but the figure is lost today.

Stern has proposed that common citizens vandalized the Ara Pacis by damaging Varus in anger over their lost loved ones, leaving the regime, which had blamed Varus, uncertain as to whether or not to fix the damage. Approximately 40 years after Varus' death, a general under Claudius, Pomponius Secundus, raided Germany and by chance rescued a few POWs from Varus' army. Claudius welcomed them home after their long captivity, their stories arousing much pity.

Cultural depictions

I, Claudius (1934) by Robert Graves, a novelization of the reigns of the first four emperors. Varus does not actually appear in the novel, but his defeat by the Germans is an important event.
The Iron Hand of Mars (1994) by Lindsey Davis; fourth book of the mystery series set during the reign of Vespasian, a portion of the novel occurs in the Teutoburger Wald.
Give Me Back My Legions! (2009) by Harry Turtledove, which details the events leading up to the battle, including a great deal of background information on Varus himself.
Undying Mercenaries (2014) by B. V. Larson, a series set in 2099, in which the main character fights with the Earth Mercenary Legion Varus. Much of the legion's culture and structure sources from Roman history and general Varus's life.
Schlammschlacht (2015) by Heilung, track four on their first album Ofnir. The poem describes the Battle of the Teutoburg Forest from the Cherusci point of view.
Varus is played by Gaetano Aronica in the Netflix series Barbarians.

References

External links

 Varusbattle in Netherland
 Livius.org: Publius Quinctilius Varus
 Discussion on the meaning of the "VAR" countermark
 Arminius / Varus. The Battle of the Teutoburg Forest – Internet-Portal "Westfälische Geschichte", LWL-Institut für westfälische Regionalgeschichte, Münster

46 BC births
AD 9 deaths
1st-century BC Roman governors of Syria
1st-century Romans
Ancient Roman military personnel who committed suicide
Germania
Imperial Roman consuls
Julio-Claudian dynasty
People from Cremona
Varus, Publius
Roman governors of Africa
Roman governors of Syria
Suicides by sharp instrument in Germany